Donald Lee Cockroft (born February 6, 1945) is a former American football punter and placekicker who played 13 seasons in the National Football League with the Cleveland Browns. He has the third most career points for a Brown behind fellow kickers Phil Dawson (second) and Lou Groza.

Cockroft served as the Browns' primary punter and placekicker for the first nine seasons of his career. In 1977, he dropped punting from his duties and became solely a placekicker.  He and Tampa Bay Buccaneers kicker/punter Dave Green were two of the last NFL players to lead their teams in both punting and kicking in the same season (1976).

He was involved in the January 4, 1981, American Football Conference divisional play-off game versus the Oakland Raiders. Cockroft missed field goals from 47 and 30-yards in the second quarter. The Browns scored a touchdown on a 42-yard interception by Ron Bolton with 6:02 left in the second quarter, but the extra point attempt by Cockroft was blocked. Cleveland would lose the game 14-12, a game which is nicknamed, Red Right 88.

Later NFL players to have this dual distinction were Steve Little of the St. Louis Cardinals in 1979, Russell Erxleben of the New Orleans Saints briefly in 1979 and 1980, and Frank Corral for the Los Angeles Rams in 1980 and 1981.

References

External links
Interview with Don Cockroft conducted by Dan Coughlin at the Cleveland Public Library Sports Research Center on August 8, 2013.

1945 births
Living people
American football placekickers
American football punters
Adams State Grizzlies football players
Cleveland Browns players
Sportspeople from Cheyenne, Wyoming
Players of American football from Wyoming
Players of American football from Colorado